Syncrossus helodes, commonly known as banded loach, tiger botia or lesser katy loach, is a freshwater fish in the loach family Botiidae. It is native to rivers in Vietnam, Thailand, Laos and Cambodia. S. helodes resembles S. hymenophysa from Borneo, Sumatra and Peninsular Malaysia, and the two have frequently been confused. It differs from the latter species by the absence of a dark spot on the dorsal fin, 10–12 bars on body without blue borders (instead of 12–15 blue-bordered bars) and the presence of irregular dark markings on the lower body.

Description
It is the largest member of the tiger botia group, which like its close relatives, is aggressive and unsuitable for community aquariums. This species, like other Syncrossus, must be maintained in groups of five or more in order to spread any aggression and to allow the fish to form a natural hierarchy.

Its preferred water parameters are pH of 7.0 or below; hardness: Soft and slightly acidic is best; dGH: < 12 degrees. Syncrossus helodes loses some of its young colouration as it matures.

Reproduction
Mature females probably have a rounder abdomen compared to males. Breeding is not known to have occurred in aquaria. Presumably a seasonal, migratory spawner in nature.

References 

Botiidae
Fish of Cambodia
Fish of Laos
Fish of Thailand
Fish of Vietnam
Fish described in 1876